Royal Consort Su of the Andong Gwon clan (Hangul: 수비 안동 권씨, Hanja: 壽妃 安東 權氏; died 29 April 1340) was the fifth wife of King Chungsuk of Goryeo.

Biography

Early life and relatives
The future Royal Consort Su was born into the Andong Gwon clan as the eldest daughter and second child of Gwon Ryeom, Prince Hyeonbok (현복군, 玄禑君) and his wife who was from the Pyeongyang Jo clan. King Chunghye's third wife, Lady Hong was once Lady Gwon's cousin.

Her paternal great-grandfather was Gwon-Bo, Internal Prince Yeongga (권보 영가부원군) and her paternal grandfather was Gwon-Jun, Internal Prince Gilchang (권준 길창부원군) who kept his loyalty to King Chungsuk when other servants loyal on Wang Go. From Gwon-Jun's succession, the Andong Gwon clan became a prestigious family and had a lot of wealth. His manor was said to admired by the king when he visited.

Marriage and Palace life
Lady Gwon was firstly marry to Jeon-Sin (전신)'s son, but her father tried to divorced them due to the quality of the Jeon family clan (전씨, 全氏). Then, in 1335 (4th years reign of King Chungsuk), the couple finally divorced under the pretext of an order from the king and Lady Gwon was honoured the Consort Su (수비, 壽妃) upon becoming the king's new consort.

In 1339, after King Chungsuk's death, Lady Gwon and his other wife–Princess Gyeonghwa was raped by his son and successor, King Chunghye.

Later life
Lady Gwon died childless on 29 April 1340, and her father, Gwon-Ryeom also died in the same year at 39 years old, so it was believed that she died at a young age (mid 20s) possibly by suicide after the shock of being raped.

Family
Father - Gwon Ryeom (권렴, 權廉) (1302 - 1340)
 Grandfather - Gwon Jun (권준, 權準)
 Great-Grandfather - Gwon Bo (권보, 權溥)
 Aunt - Lady Gwon of the Andong Gwon clan (안동 권씨)
 Uncle - Hong Tak (홍탁, 洪鐸) of the Namyang Hong clan (1295 - 1356)
 Cousin - Hong Sang-hae (홍상재, 洪尙載) (? - 1391)
 Cousin - Royal Consort Hwa-bi of the Namyang Hong clan (화비 홍씨)
 Cousin-in-law - Wang Jeong, Chunghye of Goryeo (고려 충혜왕) (22 February 1315 - 30 January 1344)
 Cousin - Lady Hong of the Namyang Hong clan (남양 홍씨)
 Cousin-in-law - Jo Heung-mun (조흥문, 趙興門) (? - 1352)
 Cousin - Hong Hye-chan (홍혜찬, 洪惠贊)
 Cousin - Hong Gae-do (홍개도, 洪開道) (? - 1359)
 Cousin - Hong Chang-do (홍창도, 洪昌道)
 Cousin - Lady Hong of the Namyang Hong clan (남양 홍씨)
 Cousin-in-law - Won Gwi-su (원귀수, 元龜壽)
 Cousin - Lady Hong of the Namyang Hong clan (남양 홍씨)
 Cousin-in-law - Yeom Dae-yu (염대유, 廉大有)
Mother - Lady Jo of the Pyeongyang Jo clan (평양 조씨)
 Grandfather - Jo Ryeon (조련, 趙璉)
 Siblings
Older brother - Gwon Yong (권용, 權鏞)
 Younger sister - Lady Gwon of the Andong Gwon clan (안동 권씨)
 Brother-in-law - Bodalsilli (보달실리, 普達實理) from Yuan
 Younger sister - Lady Gwon of the Andong Gwon clan (안동 권씨)
 Brother-in-law - Oh Jung-hwa (오중화, 吳仲和)
 Younger sister - Lady Gwon of the Andong Gwon clan (안동 권씨)
 Brother-in-law - Yeom Guk-bo (염국보, 廉國寶; d. 1388)
 Younger sister - Lady Gwon of the Andong Gwon clan (안동 권씨)
 Brother-in-law - Ryu Hye-son (류혜손, 柳惠孫) 
 Younger sister - Lady Gwon of the Andong Gwon clan (안동 권씨)
 Brother-in-law - Won Song-su (원송수, 元松壽; 1324 - 1366)
Younger brother - Gwon Hyeon (권현, 權鉉)
Younger brother - Gwon Ho (권호, 權鎬)
Younger brother - Gwon Gyun (권균, 權鈞; d. 1401)
Younger brother - Gwon Ju (권주, 權鑄; d. 1394)
 Husbands
Unknown 1st husband – No issue.
 Father-in-law - Jeon Shin (전신, 全信) (1276 - 1339)
2nd husband - Wang Man, King Chungsuk (고려 충숙왕) (3 July 1294 - 4 May 1339) – No issue.
Father-in-law - Wang Jang, King Chungseon (고려 충선왕) (20 October 1275 - 23 June 1325)
Mother-in-law - Yasokjin, Royal Consort Ui-bi (의비 야속진) (? - 6 August 1316)

References

External links
수비 권씨 on Encykorea .
수비 권씨 on Goryeosa .

Year of birth unknown
1340 deaths
14th-century Korean women
Royal consorts of the Goryeo Dynasty